Tagtabazar District is a district of Mary Province in Turkmenistan. The administrative center of the district is the town of Tagtabazar.

The district is situated very close to the Afghanistan border.

References 

Districts of Turkmenistan
Mary Region